The Ministry of Finance of Romania is one of the fifteen ministries of the Government of Romania.

The minister's seat is currently held by Adrian Câciu.

The following agencies are subordinated to the Minister:
 National Agency for Fiscal Administration (Agenția Națională de Administrare Fiscală)
 National Customs Authority (Autoritatea Națională a Vămilor)
 40 Public Finances County General Directorates (Direcții generale ale finanțelor publice judeţene), the Public Finances General Directorate of Bucharest (Direcția Generală a Finanțelor Publice a Municipiului București) and the General Directorate for the Administration of Big Taxpayers (Direcția generală de administrare a marilor contribuabili)

See also
List of Ministers of Finance of Romania

External links
www.mfinante.ro - Official website

Economy
Romania
Public finance of Romania